Eticyclidine (PCE, CI-400) is a dissociative anesthetic drug with hallucinogenic effects. It is similar in effects to phencyclidine but is slightly more potent. PCE was developed by Parke-Davis in the 1970s and evaluated for anesthetic potential under the code name CI-400, but research into PCE was not continued after the development of ketamine, a similar drug with more favourable properties. PCE is slightly more potent than PCP and has similar effects, but its unpleasant taste and tendency to cause nausea made it less accepted by users. Due to its similarity in effects to PCP, PCE was placed into the Schedule 1 list of illegal drugs in the 1970s, although it was only briefly abused in the 1970s and 1980s and is now little known.

See also 
 Arylcyclohexylamine
 3-MeO-PCE
 3-MeO-PCP
 4-MeO-PCP
 Phencyclidine
 PCPr
 Methoxetamine

References 

Arylcyclohexylamines
Dissociative drugs
Designer drugs
NMDA receptor antagonists